Severe Tropical Cyclone Val was considered to be the worst tropical cyclone to affect the Samoan Islands since the 1889 Apia cyclone.

The system that was to become Severe Tropical Cyclone Val was first identified during the opening days of December 1991, as a small circulation, within the Intertropical Convergence Zone to the north of Tokelau. Over the next few days, the system moved westwards towards Rotuma and Tuvalu and gradually developed further, before it was named Val during December 5, after it had become a category 1 tropical cyclone on the Australian tropical cyclone intensity scale. The system subsequently continued to intensify as it moved towards the Samoan Islands and peaked as a category 4 severe tropical cyclone, as it made landfall on the island of Savaii during December 6. After Val had passed over the island, weakening upper-level winds caused the system to slow down before it made a sharp clockwise loop which almost brought it over Savaii for a second time. 

The cyclone lasted for five days in American Samoa and was designated by the United States Government as a major disaster on December 13, 1991. Western Samoa suffered more damage than American Samoa. The cyclone devastated the islands with  winds and  waves. The overall damages caused by Cyclone Val in American Samoa have been variously assessed. One estimate put the damages at $50 million in American Samoa and $200 million in Western Samoa due to damage to electrical, water, and telephone connections and destruction of various government buildings, schools, and houses.

Meteorological history

During the opening days of December 1991, the Fiji Meteorological Service (FMS) started to monitor a small circulation, that had developed along the Intertropical Convergence Zone, just to the north of Tokelau as a result of a surge within the westerlies. Over the next few days, the system moved westwards towards Rotuma and Tuvalu, where it lay near the centre of an area of upper level outflow. During December 4, the FMS classified the system as a tropical depression by the FMS, while it was located just to the southeast of Tuvalu and moving north-westwards. The system was then named Val by the FMS during the next day, after it had become a category 1 tropical cyclone on the Australian tropical cyclone intensity scale. During that day the United States Naval Western Oceanography Center (NWOC) designated the system as Tropical Cyclone 06P and started to issue advisories, while Val started to move towards the south-southeast, after the upper level north-westerly steering winds increased. During December 6, the NWOC reported that the system had become equivalent to a category 2 hurricane on the Saffir-Simpson hurricane scale as Val continued to steadily intensify and moved south-eastwards, away from Tuvalu and towards the Samoan Islands. Early on December 7, the FMS reported that the system had become a category 3 severe tropical cyclone, as it started to be steered southwards by upper-level northerlies.

Later that day, the FMS reported that Val had reached its peak 10-minute sustained wind speeds of about 165 km/h (105 mph), which made it a category 4 severe tropical cyclone on the Australian scale. The system subsequently made landfall on the Samoan island of Savaii at around 1800 UTC, while the NWOC reported that the cyclone had peaked with 1-minute sustained wind speeds of about 230 km/h (145 mph), which made it equivalent to a category 4 hurricane on the SSHWS. After Val had passed over the island, weakening upper-level winds caused the system to slow down before it made a sharp clockwise loop which almost brought it over Savaii for a second time. During December 9, Val completed its loop and started to move eastwards and gradually weaken, before it passed over the American Samoan island of Tutuila early the next day. After passing over American Samoa, Val appeared to threaten the Southern Cook Islands and was expected to pass close to Palmerston Island. However, as the system continued to weaken, it started to move more towards the south-southeast then had been expected, which spared the Cook Islands. During December 12, the FMS reported that Val had weakened into a category two tropical cyclone and passed the primary warning responsibility for the system to the New Zealand Meteorological Service (NZMS) after Val had moved out of its area of responsibility. Shortly after moving into the NZMS's area of responsibility, Val transitioned into a strong extratropical depression. Storm force winds subsequently persisted around the centre of Val's extratropical remnants for the next 3 days, before the system was captured and sheared apart by strong environmental westerlies associated with the Antarctic Circumpolar Current as it approached 50°S.

Effects

Severe Tropical Cyclone Val caused over US$300 million in damage and caused 17 deaths, as it impacted the Cook Islands, American Samoa, Samoa, Tokelau, Tonga, Tuvalu as well as Wallis and Futuna. Some of these island nations were still recovering from the effects of Severe Tropical Cyclone Ofa, which had impacted Polynesia less than two years earlier. Val's main impacts were to the Samoan Islands, where it was responsible for 14 deaths and was considered to be the worst tropical cyclone to impact the islands since the 1889 Apia cyclone. As a result of the impact of this storm, the name Val was retired from the tropical cyclone naming lists.

Samoa

Val impacted Samoa between December 6 - 10, where it caused 13 deaths and significant damage estimated at $280 million.

Val impacted Samoa between December 6–10 while it was still recovering from the effects of Ofa, which had destroyed the economy of the nation 22 months earlier during February 1990. During December 5–6, ahead of the cyclone directly impacting the island nation, north-easterly winds and high seas associated with the system, damaged the northern coastal areas of both Savai'i and Upolu. During December 6, a gale warning was issued for Samoa by the FMS during December 6, before it issued a hurricane warning for the island nation during the next day. Ahead of the system making landfall on Savaii at around 18:00 UTC (07:00 WST) on December 7, the then Prime Minister of Samoa Tofilau Eti Alesana prayed for the country to be spared the brunt of Val's destructive winds in a radio address. He asked Samoans to pray to God for deliverance of this prayer, but also urged acceptance of the storm as God's will.

The cyclone destroyed over 65% of the residential homes on American Samoa and even more on the Samoan islands of Upolu and Savai'i. Cyclone Val cut communications and power lines on the islands. It devastated fire stations, hospitals, government buildings, schools, and churches, particularly wooden buildings of the pre World War I colonial era. Cyclone Val destroyed over 80% of agricultural crops. One of the first areas hit was the Western Samoan island of Savai'i, which was described as looking like an atomic bomb had hit. A local remarked that "there was no green, no buildings standing, no shelter; just total and complete devastation."  Cyclone Val was assessed to have had an impact 50% worse than Cyclone Ofa, costing about $50 million in damage and putting a severe strain on agricultural production and the livelihoods of farmers on the islands. In Fagatele Bay at Tutuila Island, where Cyclone Val made a direct pass, the coral reef was completely destroyed. A large strip of the coast was also eroded. In response to this disaster, the NOAA deputed an assessment team to survey the damage to the reefs. In Tutuila, which accounts for 68% of American Samoa, the funicular railway, the longest single span cableway in the world, was permanently put out of service by Cyclone Val. The cable had previously connected Pago Pago harbor with the TV tower erected on Mt. Alava (491m). The TV tower at Utulei, one of the three TV channels in Samoa, was completely ruined by Cyclone Val, resulting in it being cannibalized for parts to maintain the two remaining channels. The Fagalele Boys School, one of the oldest European-style buildings on the island in Leone, was destroyed by Cyclone Val. According to a report of Greenpeace mission, the airport of Western Samoa was also devastated.

Food production was halted; forests were damaged, and animals and birds were lost. The forest loss was as severe as 45% of Savai'i's timber logs.

People were devoid of electricity for weeks and water supply for many days and depended on emergency aid. In Western Samoa (islands of Savai'i, Manono and Upolu), the percentage of damaged houses was as high as 80%.

American Samoa
During December 6, the FMS issued a tropical cyclone alert for American Samoa, before it issued a gale warning for the American territory later that day. Storm and hurricane warnings were subsequently issued during the next day, before the weather station at Pago Pago reported its first gale-force winds later that day at around 14:00 UTC (02:00 UTC+11). The hurricane warning was subsequently downgraded to a gale warning during December 8, as Val moved south-eastwards towards Savaii and the threat of the cyclone passing close to the American territory decreased. However, after Val had made landfall on Savaii, it moved erratically and performed a clockwise loop just to the southwest of Savaii, before it started to move eastwards towards American Samoa. As a result, the FMS reissued a hurricane warning for American Samoa during December 9, before Val's eye passed near or over the island of Tutuila early the next day.
 
Ahead of Val making landfall on the territory, the American Red Cross, the Federal Emergency Management Agency and the United States Army Corps of Engineers were placed on standby to fly to Pago Pago as soon as the airport reopened. High seas impacting the territory caused at least one coastal village to be evacuated.

Severe damage was subsequently reported in the territory, with 100% of crops damaged and 90% of houses/homes destroyed.

Other island nations
As Val's precursor tropical depression developed, strong winds associated with the intertropical convergence zone, caused some minor damage to the Tuvaluan atoll of Funafuti and various other atolls in the island nation. During December 4, a strong wind warning was issued for the island nation of Tokelau, after the system had developed into a tropical depression. A tropical cyclone alert was subsequently issued during the next day, as it was thought that the cyclone could pose a threat to the island nation as it moved eastwards. Squally conditions subsequently persisted over the islands for the next few days, with Fakaofo recording gale-force winds during December 10, in association with a convective rainband. Within the island nation, residents took refuge within in a school building, while strong winds and high seas caused damage to homes and several uncompleted seawall structures, that were being installed following Ofa's impacts on the islands. The United Nations Development Programme subsequently funded a project between 1992 and 1995, which provided a limited reconstruction of the areas damaged by the cyclone.

During December 6, as the system moved southeastwards towards Samoa, the threat of gale-force or stronger winds developing over northern Tonga and the island of Wallis, within the French Overseas Territory of Wallis and Futuna increased. As a result, the FMS issued gale warnings for the islands of Niuafoʻou, Niuatoputapu and Wallis, while issuing a tropical cyclone alert for the rest of the Tongan islands. However, the warnings were cancelled during the next day, as the threat of gale-force or stronger winds developing over Wallis or northern Tonga had decreased. During December 8, after the system had made landfall on Savaii, Val started to move south-westwards and posed another threat to northern Tonga. As a result, a gale warning was reissued for Niuatoputapu, while the rest of Tonga was placed under a strong wind warning. A storm warning was subsequently issued for Niuatoputapu during December 9, after Val had produced gale-force winds over the island and moved closer to it. Wallis Island also did not experience any gale-force winds, however, some minor damage was reported on the island, after some minor flooding of coastal areas occurred.

During December 10, the FMS issued a gale warning for Palmerston Island and a tropical cyclone alert for the rest of the Southern Cook Islands, as Val accelerated south-eastwards and appeared to threaten the islands. As a result, the Southern Cook Islands were spared any major damage from the system. However, gale- and storm-force winds were reported on the island during December 11, which were subsequently attributed to a convective rainband and rain squalls that appeared on satellite imagery at the time. Gale-force winds were also reported over Pukapuka and nearby islands in the Northern Cook Islands during December 11. Within the Cook Islands, damages to crops and infrastructure were reported, with total damages estimated at around $1 million NZD (US$544 thousand). The government of the Cook Islands also asked for money to repair a seawall.

Aftermath

American Samoa
The President of United States declared the event as a "major disaster", for which federal assistance was provided. The severity of Cyclone Val was aptly described  by a local resident who stated: "But this Cyclone was stronger than me. For the first time I felt defeated I had never felt that before. I felt it was personal between me and Cyclone. I got depressed afterward." Aid was provided to the affected zones based on a categorization as Category A, B, C, D, E and F. The categories are defined by the degree of damage suffered. Assistance covered individuals, households, and the State and local governments. The assistance encouraged private, nonprofit organizations (NGOs) to meet and discuss expense-related emergency work and the repair or replacement of disaster-damaged infrastructure. Assistance provided "Hazard Mitigation Grants" to secure life and property from hazards. New Zealand and Australia provided considerable assistance to the affected population and helped with the reconstruction and recovery of infrastructure facilities. Samoans in the United States, Australia, and New Zealand helped finance the recovery by way of remittances to their relatives who suffered on the island.

Law suit
In 1991, American Samoa purchased a $45 million "all risk" insurance policy from the firm Affiliated FM Insurance. The firm would only pay up to $6.1 million for the damages, arguing that the insurance did not cover water damage, only that caused by the wind. Attorney William Shernoff investigated and discovered that the insurance company had altered American Samoa's insurance policy to exclude damages caused by "wind-driven water", despite the fact that it still covered cyclones. The case was taken to court, and in 1995, the jury awarded the American Samoa Government $28.9 million. Soon after, the amount was doubled to $57.8 million to include punitive damages. The total damages awarded by the judgment was $86.7 million, which the judge stated to be "the largest insurance bad faith verdict in the state of California in 1995".

The revenues of American Samoa for the fiscal years 2002 and 2003, which had been showing a downward trend, registered a substantial increase attributed to the insurance settlement of claims made to cover the damages caused by Cyclone Val. This resulted in fiscal surpluses. The deficit of US$23.1 million at the start of 2001 changed to a surplus of US$43.2 million by end of 2003.

Samoa
As the system impacted the Samoan Islands, the New Zealand Government set up an emergency task force, to coordinate their response to the cyclone. The task force planned to deploy a Royal New Zealand Air Force Orion to conduct an aerial reconnaissance flight during December 8, however, this was postponed until December 10, due to the weather conditions over the Samoan Islands. They also planned to send a frigate to Samoa with relief supplies on board during December 10, as it was thought that the airport might have to be closed for a little while.

See also

1889 Apia cyclone
Cyclone Evan
Cyclone Heta

References

External links

Category 4 South Pacific cyclones
1991–92 South Pacific cyclone season
Retired South Pacific cyclones
1991 in Tokelau
1991 in Tuvalu
1991 in American Samoa
1991 in Samoa
1991 in the Cook Islands
1991 in Tonga
1991 in Wallis and Futuna
Tropical cyclones in Tokelau
Tropical cyclones in Tuvalu
Tropical cyclones in American Samoa
Tropical cyclones in Samoa
Tropical cyclones in the Cook Islands
Tropical cyclones in Tonga
Tropical cyclones in Wallis and Futuna